Warwat Khanderao is a village, in Sangrampur tehsil of Buldhana district, Maharashtra State,  India.

Geography
It is located MH State Highway 173 connecting Shegaon - Warwat Bakal - Bawanbir and Tunki. MDR 2 Major Districts Road 2 connects Paturda - Kondri - Ukali Bk, on east side and Kavtal - Bhendwad - Khandvi on west side.

Demographics
 India census, Warwat Khanderao had a population of 1447.

Description 

The town post office Postal Index Number ( PIN code) is 444201 and PIN is shared with Jastgaon, Paturda, Wankhed, Kavthal and Kodri post offices.

Some of nearby villages are Tamgaon, Bodkha, Wakana, Ladnapur, Tunki,  Sagoda, Palsoda, Dhamangaon, Palsi Zasi, Kolad, Bawanbir, Wadgaon Pr Adgaon, Kolad, Kakanwada Bk, Kakanwada Kh, Pimpri Adgaon, Niwana, Banoda Eklara, Jamod, Durgadatiya, Wankhed, Danapur, Hingani Bk, Raikhed, Belkhed, Gadegaon, Tudgaon, Isapur, Malegaon Bazar,

Nearby towns are Sonala, Akot, Sangrampur, Jalgaon Jamod, Telhara, Shegaon
.

References

Villages in Buldhana district